Petar Pavlović (born 28 July 1997) is an Austrian former football player.

Club career
He made his Austrian Football First League debut for SC Austria Lustenau on 12 September 2017 in a game against Floridsdorfer AC and scored on his debut.

He retired from playing football at the end of the 2021–22 season at the age of 25 to attend medical school.

References

External links
 

1997 births
Living people
Austrian footballers
Association football forwards
Austria youth international footballers
FC St. Gallen players
SC Austria Lustenau players
FC Gossau players
SC Brühl players
Swiss Promotion League players
Swiss 1. Liga (football) players
2. Liga (Austria) players
Austrian expatriate footballers
Expatriate footballers in Switzerland
Austrian expatriate sportspeople in Switzerland